Bettina Plank (born 24 February 1992) is an Austrian karateka. She won one of the bronze medals in the women's 55 kg event at the 2020 Summer Olympics in Tokyo, Japan. She is a two-time bronze medalist in the women's 50 kg event at the World Karate Championships. She also won the gold medal in her event at the 2015 European Karate Championships in Istanbul, Turkey.

In 2019, she won the gold medal in the women's kumite 50 kg event at the European Games held in Minsk, Belarus. In 2015, she won the silver medal in that event at the European Games in Baku, Azerbaijan. In the final, she lost against Serap Özçelik of Turkey.

Career 

She won one of the bronze medals in the women's kumite 50 kg event at the 2011 European Karate Championships held in Zürich, Switzerland. In 2014, she won the silver medal in her event at the European Karate Championships held in Tampere, Finland.

In 2015, she won the gold medal in the women's kumite 50 kg event at the European Karate Championships held in Istanbul, Turkey. She also won one of the bronze medals in the women's team kumite event. She won one of the bronze medals in her event at the 2016 World University Karate Championships held in Braga, Portugal. She also won one of the bronze medals in the women's team kumite event.

In 2017, she competed in the women's kumite 50 kg event at the World Games held in Wrocław, Poland without winning a medal. She won one match and lost two matches in the elimination round and she did not advance to compete in the semi-finals. In 2018, she won one of the bronze medals in the women's kumite 50 kg event at the World Karate Championships held in Madrid, Spain.

In June 2021, she competed at the World Olympic Qualification Tournament held in Paris, France hoping to qualify for the 2020 Summer Olympics in Tokyo, Japan. She did not qualify at this tournament but she was able to qualify via continental representation soon after. At the Olympics, she won one of the bronze medals in the women's 55 kg event. In November 2021, she competed in the women's 50 kg event at the World Karate Championships held in Dubai, United Arab Emirates. In her second match, she lost against Shara Hubrich of Germany and she was then eliminated in the repechage by Kateryna Kryva of Ukraine.

She competed in the women's 50 kg event at the 2022 European Karate Championships held in Gaziantep, Turkey. She also competed in the women's team kumite event.

Achievements

References

External links 

 
 

1992 births
Living people
Place of birth missing (living people)
Austrian female karateka
Karateka at the 2015 European Games
Karateka at the 2019 European Games
European Games medalists in karate
European Games gold medalists for Austria
European Games silver medalists for Austria
Competitors at the 2017 World Games
Karateka at the 2020 Summer Olympics
Olympic medalists in karate
Medalists at the 2020 Summer Olympics
Olympic bronze medalists for Austria
21st-century Austrian women